The San Ricardo Formation is a geologic formation in Mexico. It preserves fossils dating back to the Late Jurassic to Early Cretaceous periods.

See also 
 List of fossiliferous stratigraphic units in Mexico

References 

Jurassic System of North America
Upper Jurassic Series
Jurassic Mexico
Tithonian Stage
Lower Cretaceous Series of North America
Cretaceous Mexico
Berriasian Stage